Orange County Speedway is a asphalt oval in Orange County, North Carolina, near Rougemont. It first opened in 1966 as and dirt oval (Trico Speedway), which operated until 1967 and 1973, respectively. The facility was reopened and paved in 1983. With a slogan of "the fastest 3/8-mile race track in America," the oval features 19-degree banking through the turns and 16 degrees on the straightaways, creating three distinct grooves making for very fast turns. The aluminum grandstands stretch from Turn 4 all the way down the front straightaway to Turn 1. The speedway closed in 2003 but reopened on March 11, 2006.

Some of the most famous names in stock car racing have raced at the Orange County Speedway, including Dale Earnhardt, Jeff Gordon, Mark Martin, Davey and Donnie Allison, Dale Jarrett, Jeff and Ward Burton, Elliott and Hermie Sadler, Scott Riggs, Michael Waltrip,  Todd Bodine, Kyle Petty and Bobby Labonte. Some more recent notable drivers include Timothy Peters, Darrell "Bubba" Wallace Jr., Ryan Blaney, Jeb Burton, Timmy Hill, Ryan Reed, Jesse Little and Gray Gaulding. David Pearson and Glen Wood raced at the speedway when it was a dirt track. The track currently runs a regular weekly show on the second and fourth Saturday night of each month, April through October. The facility also hosts the PASS Super Late Model series, CARS Super Late Model Tour and CARS Late Model Stock Tour.

History

In 1966, the speedway underwent significant improvement, which is considered the actual launch date of the track. It opened as a 1/4-mile dirt oval, but soon was increased to 5/8 mile and remained until 1973.

In 1973, the track hosted one NASCAR Grand National East Series event.

In 1983, the speedway underwent more improvements. 19-degree banking was added in the turns and 16-degree banking in straightaways to assure more safety for drivers and exciting on-car movements for fans. At that time, the Orange County Speedway became known as “the fastest 3/8-mile race track in America".

In 1983, the NASCAR Busch Grand National Series (now Xfinity Series) began running events at the speedway. Orange County Speedway was one of the first tracks in the area to have live televised Busch races; the first was the 1990 Roses Stores 200 on June 9, 1990.

Between 1986 and 1988, the facility hosted 5 NASCAR Whelen Modified Tour races. Also, the track hosted 3 NASCAR Southeast Series events between 1993 and 1999.

ASA National Tour ran 2 events at the speedway, between 1998 and 1999. And CARS X-1R Pro Cup Series ran 5 races at Orange County Speedway between 1997 and 2014.

At the start of 21st century, the track was in bad shape and attendance had been falling. Eventually the track was shut down in 2003. Then in March 2006, under a new management team, the track reopened. Volunteers put in time to rehabilitation of the speedway for the opening day. The event was a big success, with a large crowd for the first time in years.

Major results

NASCAR Busch Grand National Series
The NASCAR Busch Grand National Series (now Xfinity Series) had 27 races at the speedway from 1983 until 1994.

Multiple winners (drivers)

Multiple winners (makes)

Only other car make to win was on June 27, 1987, Mark Martin won driving a Ford.

Notable races

1986 L.D. Swain 150 - Dale Jarrett earned his first ever win in a NASCAR major series.
1986 Roses Stores 150 - This was Larry Pearson's only win on his way to his first Busch Championship. Also future Busch series Champion, Rob Moroso, made his NASCAR debut on his 18th birthday.
1987 Poole Equipment 150 - Mark Martin won the event, giving Ford its first and only Busch Series win at the track.
1989 Roses Stores 200 - Jimmy Spencer was dominant in the event driving a white sponsor-less #34 Buick. Spencer lead 190 of the 200 laps and lapped the field on his way to the win.
1990 Roses Stores 200 - This was the first live televised Busch race at Orange County Speedway. Jeff Burton got his first pole in the Busch Series, while Chuck Bown lead 106 laps on the way for the victory.
1991 Roses Stores 300 - Jeff Gordon earned his first career Busch series pole in this event. Shawna Robinson made her first career start as Robert Pressley took the win.
1991 Texas Pete 300 - Jimmy Hensley lapped the field on the way to victory. To date, this is the last time anyone lapped the field in a Busch Series race. Jack Ingram withdrew from this race after his son was killed the week before. Ingram never raced again in the Busch series.
1994 Pantry Stores 300 - The last Busch series race at Orange County Speedway. Some confusion arose at the end of the race on who had won. With two laps to go George Crenshaw blew his engine and poured oil on the track. Two of the leaders, Hermie Sadler and 3rd place Ricky Craven, got into the oil and spun out. Sadler recovered, but was passed for the lead by Dennis Setzer, who had moved into 2nd place, and took the white flag as the caution was displayed. NASCAR determined that Sadler had already taken the caution flag, declaring Sadler as the winner.

Track champions

See also
 List of NASCAR race tracks

References

External links

Orange County Speedway race results at Racing-Reference

Sports venues in Orange County, North Carolina
Motorsport venues in North Carolina
NASCAR tracks
1966 establishments in North Carolina